Mast Maja Maadi is a 2008 Kannada comedy-romance film directed by R. Ananth Raju featuring Sudeep, Vijay Raghavendra, Diganth, Naga Kiran, Komal and Jennifer Kotwal in the lead roles. The film features background score and soundtrack composed by P. B. Balaji and lyrics by K. Ram Narayan.  It is a remake of the 2007 Hindi comedy film Dhamaal, with the opening sequences copied from the 2006 comedy Golmaal: Fun Unlimited. This film stars the highest number of guest roles in recent times. Sudeep's role is also supposed to be a guest appearance in the film. Upendra turns item boy for this film; he dances with 12 heroines for an end credits song in the style of Shah Rukh Khan's Om Shanti Om.

Plot

Mast Maja Maadi is the story of four good-for-nothing, unemployed youngsters in search of treasure hidden in a place in Ooty’s Botanical Gardens. Apart from them, a cop is also eyeing the treasure. The youngsters’ attempts to get the treasure all to themselves and the hurdles they face in their mission form the crux of the story

Cast
 Sudeep as ACP Pratap 
 Vijay Raghavendra as Ramu
 Diganth as Kamesh
 Naga Kiran as Shyam Bhatatei
 Komal as Mylaari
 Jennifer Kotwal as Sahana 
 Rangayana Raghu as Somanath Tantri, Kamesh's father
 Umashree as Keerthi Bedi, Police Commissioner 
 Sadhu Kokila as Bond DK 
 Tennis Krishna
 Sihi Kahi Chandru as Samarasimha Reddy 
 R.N.Sudarshan as Moneylink Shastry 
 Nagashekar
 Shankar Rao as College Principal Bekupa - Bedarahalli Kumarappa Son Palakshappa 
Bullet Prakash as Hari Navarathan 
R. Anantharaju 
K. Ram Narayan 
Bangalore Amjad Khan 
Mandeep Rai 
 Shantamma

Guest roles
Following actors and actresses appear as themselves in the song "Shakalaka Bhoom"
 Upendra
 Rekha Vedavyas
 Sharmila Mandre
 Sanjjanaa
 Sherin
 Gowri Munjal
 Suman Ranganathan
 Ragini Dwivedi
 Aindrita Ray
 Keerthi Chawla

Soundtrack
The music was composed By P. B. Balaji and released by Akshaya Audio.

Release and reception
Mast Maja Maadi released on 12 December 2008 in India.

Bangalore Mirror opined that "Set aside your thinking cap and just enjoy maadi". R. G. Vijayasarathy of Rediff.com wrote that "Mast Maja Maadi is a timepass film if you like comedy".

References

External links
 
 

2008 films
2000s Kannada-language films
Indian comedy films
Kannada remakes of Hindi films
2008 comedy films